Current bases:
Ali Al Salem Air Base
Ahmad al-Jaber Air Base
Camp Arifjan
Camp Buehring (formerly Camp Udairi)
Camp Patriot (shared with Kuwait Naval Base)
Camp Spearhead (shared with port of Ash Shuaiba)

No longer existent:
Camp Maine (closed in 2003)
Camp Pennsylvania (closed in 2004)
Camp New Jersey (closed in 2004, combined to become part of Camp Virginia)
Camp New York (closed in 2004, reactivated and deactivated several times since)
Camp Wolverine (closed in 2005)
Camp Victory (closed in 2006)
Camp Doha (closed in 2006, forces and equipment distributed among Camps Arifjan and Buehring)
Camp Navistar (closed in 2007)
Camp LSA (closed in 2013, U.S. Army administered part of Ali Al Salem Air Base)
Camp Amber SEMC (unofficial closed in 2013 TS,S,C)
Camp Virginia (closed in 2013)
KCIA Camp Wolf (closed in 2005) 

TAA Thunder  (closed in 2003)

External links
Kuwait Facilities at Global Security
2004 Map of US military facilities in Kuwait

Installations in Kuwait

Army installations in Kuwait